Acritochaete is a genus of African plants in the grass family.

The only known species is Acritochaete volkensii, native to Nigeria, Cameroon, islands of the Gulf of Guinea, Zaïre, Burundi, Uganda, Kenya, Tanzania, Ethiopia, and South Sudan.

See also
 List of Poaceae genera

References

External links
 Grassbase - The World Online Grass Flora

Panicoideae
Monotypic Poaceae genera
Flora of Africa
Taxa named by Robert Knud Friedrich Pilger